HMS Westminster is a Type 23 frigate of the Royal Navy, and the second ship to bear the name. She was launched on 4 February 1992 and named for the Dukedom of Westminster.

Operational history

1994–2000
In early August 1995, Operation Harlech was initiated in response to a volcanic eruption in Montserrat. The Westminster arrived off the island on 9 August and provided emergency relief aid.

Westminster was used for the interior shots in the 1997 James Bond film Tomorrow Never Dies as three different (fictional) Type 23 frigates – HMS Chester, HMS Devonshire and HMS Bedford. For the exterior shots HMS Somerset was used with some features added by model construction.

On 3 February 1999, Westminster joined the Atlantic Patrol Ship South, relieving HMS Norfolk which was taking part in Operation Basilica in Sierra Leone. When the situation improved it was decided to withdraw Westminster and she sailed from the area on 18 March.

2001–2010
In 2004, Westminster was assigned one of the Royal Navy's first Merlin helicopters. Also in 2004, the ship was the first to be fitted with the new low-frequency Sonar 2087 designed to detect the most advanced submarines. The technology is controversial as its effects on marine wildlife remain unclear.

In December 2005, the ship's company of Westminster were all granted Freedom of the City of Westminster. 200 naval officers and sailors in full ceremonial uniform paraded through the streets of London from Westminster Abbey to Horse Guards as part of the celebration service. Westminster was chosen as a very rare recognition of her contributions to Westminster schools, local charities and the community as a whole. The honour entitles the crew the freedom to "parade through the City on all ceremonial occasions in full panoply and with drums beating, colours flying and bayonets fixed".

The frigate was deployed to Burma in May 2008 to spearhead the British relief effort after Cyclone Nargis devastated the country, but later had to withdraw after the junta refused to grant permission for aid to be landed.

2011–present
In March 2011, Westminster took part in Operation Ellamy, the British role in the coalition action during the 2011 Libyan civil war by enforcing a naval blockade. She took part in Exercise Saxon Warrior in the Western Approaches with the US aircraft carrier  in May 2011, culminating in a so-called 'Thursday War'.

On 23 January 2012, Westminster departed Portsmouth to reinforce the British guided-missile destroyer  that was also underway for the Persian Gulf to relieve the frigate .

Whilst in the Persian Gulf she made a port call in Dubai where one of her sailors (Leading Seaman Timothy Andrew MacColl, 27, from Gosport in Hampshire) disappeared, prompting a bilateral search between the Royal Navy and local authorities. He was declared dead by the Royal Navy in May 2014.

In early 2013, she was part of the multi-national Exercise Joint Warrior, practising amphibious operations off the coast of Scotland. In September she was part of the COUGAR 13 task group, for a series of joint exercises in the Mediterranean and Persian Gulf. She visited Gibraltar on the way to the Middle East. This came amidst growing tensions between Spain and Britain over the status of Gibraltar; however the British Government described the visit as 'routine'. In the Gulf of Oman, Westminster conducted anti-submarine drills against . In October 2013, she exercised with the Indian Navy off Goa.

On 8 September 2014, she docked at East India Dock, by Canary Wharf, in London. In November 2014, Westminster entered extended refit in Portsmouth; she returned to sea in January 2017 with a new principal weapon system, Sea Ceptor, in place of Seawolf, Radar Type 997 (better known as Artisan) and numerous modifications and alterations to her accommodation and working spaces.

Westminster, in company with  sailed with USS George H.W. Bush again, as in 2011, by taking part in Exercise Saxon Warrior off Scotland.

During December 2018 on a tour of the Baltic Sea, Westminster experienced problems with her propulsion and engines while visiting the port of Gdynia, curtailing other port visits in the region.

In July 2020, she took part in NATO exercise Dynamic Mongoose.

In September 2022, Westminster fired two Harpoon missiles in Operation Atlantic Thunder 22 in a SinkEx exercise alongside US forces in which the decommissioned US frigate USS Boone was sunk in the North Atlantic.

Affiliations

 Churchers College Royal Navy CCF Section
 City of London School Royal Navy CCF Section
 City of Westminster
 Duke of Westminster
 Haringey and Enfield Sea Cadet Unit
 Household Cavalry Mounted Regiment
 National Westminster Bank (Westminster branch)
 Southgate and Barnet Sea Cadet Unit
 The Parliamentary Maritime Group
 Queen's Own Yeomanry
 University of London Royal Naval Unit
 Westminster Abbey Choir School
 Westminster Underground Station
 Worshipful Company of Fan Makers

References

External links

 

Frigates of the United Kingdom
History of the City of Westminster
Ships built by Swan Hunter
Ships built on the River Tyne
1992 ships
Type 23 frigates of the Royal Navy